Villa Alcaraz is a village and municipality in Entre Ríos Province in north-eastern Argentina.

References

Jewish Argentine settlements
Populated places in Entre Ríos Province